Julie Annabelle McNally Cahill (née McNally; born March 5, 1966) is an American producer, writer and animator who co-created the Cartoon Network series My Gym Partner's a Monkey with her husband Tim Cahill. She, along with her husband, have co-created and are story editors for the 2012 Littlest Pet Shop series. She and her husband also worked at Warner Bros. on shows like The Sylvester & Tweety Mysteries, Histeria, Detention, Animaniacs, Baby Looney Tunes, Mucha Lucha, and Krypto the Superdog.

Screenwriting

Television
 series head writer denoted in bold
 The Sylvester & Tweety Mysteries (1997-1998)
 Histeria! (1998-2000)
 Detention (1999-2000)
 Baby Looney Tunes (2002)
 Tutenstein (2004)
 ¡Mucha Lucha! (2004-2005)
 Krypto the Superdog (2005)
 My Gym Partner's a Monkey (2005-2008)
 Sherm! (2006)
 The High Fructose Adventures of Annoying Orange (2012-2013)
 Littlest Pet Shop (2012-2016)
 Transformers: Robots in Disguise (2017)
 The Tom and Jerry Show (2018-2019)
 The Gumazing Gum Girl! (TBA)

Films
 Carrotblanca (1995)
 Tweety’s High-Flying Adventure (2000)
 Tom and Jerry: The Magic Ring (2001)
 Baby Looney Tunes' Eggs-traordinary Adventure (2003)

References

External links 
 
 

1966 births
American television directors
American writers
American animators
American women television directors
American women writers
American women animators
Living people
Cartoon Network Studios people